Malankara Syrian Orthodox Theological Seminary (MSOTS) is run by the Malankara Jacobite Syriac Orthodox Church, with an ecumenical outlook.  The Malankara Syrian Orthodox Theological Seminary: a venture in union theological training in South India, MSOTS is affiliated to the Senate of Serampore College (University), West Bengal. MSOTS is located in Vettickal, Mulanthuruthy in Ernakulam, Kerala.

Administration
The seminary is under the supervision of H.H. Moran Mor Ignatius Aprem II, the Patriarch of Antioch and all the East, controlled by H.B. Aboon Mor Baselios Thomas I Catholicos, the Episcopal Committee and guided by H.E. Dr. Mor Theophilose Kuriakose Metropolitan. Besides the Seminary is a registered charitable society functioning according to a written registered constitution. The Seminary is affiliated to the Serampore University and after completion of the course the candidates are eligible to get a valid theological degree (BD).

Courses offered
Certificate of Theology (C.Th.)
Bachelor of Theology (B.Th.) affiliated to the Senate of Serampore
Integrated Bachelor of Divinity affiliated to the Senate of Serampore
Bachelor of Divinity (B.D.) affiliated to the Senate of Serampore

References

External links
Official website:org MSOT Serminary Udayagiri, Mulanthurhty

Christian seminaries and theological colleges in India
Seminaries and theological colleges affiliated to the Senate of Serampore College (University)
Jacobite Syrian Christian Church
Educational institutions in India with year of establishment missing